Desert Christian Schools, or DCS,  is a private Christian school in Lancaster, California. DCS shares their property with Grace Chapel. DCS uses RenWeb as their school management system.

History
A group of leaders of the First Baptist Church in Lancaster, California led by George and Sharon Runner broke ground on a new school in 1976. The Family Learning Center opened its doors in 1977. Its first year included preschool classrooms, one kindergarten class, and after school care. The Learning Village Grade School opened in 1979 with the addition of first and second grades. By 1984, the school had expanded to include preschool, elementary and middle school, and by 1988, the infrastructure was complete with the addition of high school classes and an enrollment of 1300 students. It was at this time the name was changed to Desert Christian Schools, a name that more succinctly described the role of the schools as a Christian education institution in the Antelope Valley.

The school has been accredited by the Association of Christian Schools International and the Western Association of Schools and Colleges and has been awarded the AV's Best Private School distinction over 20 times. It currently is the 2020 AV's Best Private School, an award voted upon by readers of the valley newspaper.

Campus
Desert Christian Elementary School and Middle school are located on a  site on 15th Street West.

Elementary school
Desert Christian Elementary School, or DCES, is Desert Christian's elementary school which is located on the main campus. The principal of DCES is Robin Kruzner.

Middle school
Desert Christian Middle School, or DCMS, is Desert Christian's middle school which is located on the main campus. The principal of DCMS is Lisa Costello.

High school
Desert Christian High School, or DCHS, is Desert Christian's high school. DCHS was opened in 1988. The DCHS campus is located at 2340 W Avenue J8. The principal of DCHS is Brian Roseborough.

DCHS offers Advanced Placement classes as well as Dual Credit Classes affording students the opportunity to earn college credits while still in high school.

After School Care 
Peach Factory is the name of Desert Christian Schools' before and after-school care for children kindergarten through eighth grade.

References

External links
 Desert Christian School

Christian schools in California
Schools in Los Angeles County, California
Educational institutions established in 1977
Education in Lancaster, California
Private high schools in California
Private middle schools in California
Private elementary schools in California
1977 establishments in California